The 1990 Japan Series was the Nippon Professional Baseball (NPB) championship series for the 1990 season. It was the 41st Japan Series and featured the Pacific League champion Seibu Lions against the Central League champion Yomiuri Giants. Seibu won the PL pennant for the seventh time in nine years to reach the series, and Yomiuri dominated the CL to return to the series after winning it the year before. Played at Tokyo Dome and Seibu Lions Stadium, the Lions swept the heavily favored Giants in four games to win the franchise's 10th Japan Series title. Seibu slugger and former MLB player Orestes Destrade was named Most Valuable Player of the series. The series was played between October 20 and October 24 with home field advantage going to the Central League.

Summary

Matchups

Game 1

Game 2

Game 3

Game 4

See also
1990 World Series

References

External links
 Nippon Professional Baseball—Official website (in English)

Japan Series
Japan Series
Japan Series
Japan Series
Seibu Lions
Yomiuri Giants